One Eighty is the fourth album by Ambrosia, released in 1980 on Warner Bros. Records. The title was believed by fans to signal the group's "180-degree" change in direction.

The album peaked at No. 25 on the Billboard 200, continuing the success of the band. Among the three singles, "Biggest Part of Me" and "You're the Only Woman" were top 20 hits, peaking at No. 3 and No. 13 on the Billboard Hot 100, respectively. The album also earned the band three Grammy nominations, including Best Pop Vocal Group.

Track listing

Personnel
Ambrosia
 David Pack – guitars, vocals
 David Cutler Lewis – acoustic piano, Rhodes, Prophet-5, Minimoog, synthesizer solos
 Joe Puerta – bass, vocals
 Burleigh Drummond – drums, percussion, vocals
 Royce Jones – percussion, vocals
 Christopher North – Chamberlin, clavinet, Minimoog, organ, backing vocals

Additional musicians
 Ernie Watts – saxophone (4, 9)
 Daniel Kobialka – violin (5)

Production
 Ambrosia – producers 
 Freddie Piro – producer 
 Bill Pfordresher – associate producer 
 Michael Verdick – engineer, mixing
 Joe Bellamy – additional recording 
 Win Kutz – additional recording
 Doug Sax – mastering at The Mastering Lab (Hollywood, CA).
 Teri Piro – production coordinator 
 Glen Christensen – design 
 Norman Seeff – photography

Charts
Album

Singles

Certifications

References

External links

1980 albums
Ambrosia (band) albums
Warner Records albums
Albums recorded at Sound City Studios